A Roteiro was a Portuguese navigational route description compiled to aid sailors and pilots and used from the 16th to the 19th centuries, an early version of a Baedeker Guide. The Portuguese word 'roteiro' translates as 'route'.

Well-known roteiros are:

 Aleixo da Mota's roteiro of the 1600s, describing the route from India along the African coast.
 The 1666 Roteiro da India Oriental by Antonio de Maris Carneiro, which describes the coastline from Sofala to Mombasa, noting harbours and sandbars, Cape Finisterre and the Strait of Gibraltar.
 The 1823 Roteiro da costa do Maranhaõ ePará by António Gregório de Freitas, covering the coastline of Maranhão and Pará, two northeastern states of Brazil.

References

Navigation
Travel guide books